This is a list of all the United States Supreme Court cases from volume 373 of the United States Reports:

 Sanders v. United States, 
 Locomotive Engineers v. Louisville & Nashville R. Co., 
 Maximov v. United States, 
 Hawaii v. Gordon,  (per curiam)
 White v. Maryland,  (per curiam)
 Johnson v. Virginia,  (per curiam)
 A. L. Kornman Co. v. Pack,  (per curiam)
 Foreman v. Bellefontaine,  (per curiam)
 Halliburton Oil Well Cementing Co. v. Reily, 
 Brady v. Maryland, 
 Willner v. Committee on Character and Fitness, Appellate Div. of Supreme Court of N. Y., First Judicial Dept., 
 Railway Clerks v. Allen, 
 Florida Lime & Avocado Growers, Inc. v. Paul, 
 Namet v. United States, 
 Whipple v. Commissioner, 
 Gutierrez v. Waterman S. S. Corp., 
 NLRB v. Erie Resistor Corp., 
 Smith v. Mississippi,  (per curiam)
 Shott v. Ohio,  (Appeal from the Supreme Court of Ohio. Certiorari denied, appeal dismissed; per curiam.)
 Flora Constr. Co. v. Grand Junction Steel Fabricating Co.,  (per curiam)
 Abernathy v. Carpenter,  (per curiam)
 George v. Clemmons,  (per curiam)
 Boyes v. United States,  (per curiam)
 Copenhaver v. Bennett,  (per curiam)
 Baker v. United States,  (per curiam)
 Clark v. Pennsylvania,  (per curiam)
 Peterson v. Greenville, 
 Shuttlesworth v. Birmingham, 
 Lombard v. Louisiana, 
 Wright v. Georgia, 
 Wisconsin v. FPC, 
 Andrews v. United States, 
 Silver v. New York Stock Exchange, 
 Baltimore & Ohio R. Co. v. Boston & Maine R. Co.,  (per curiam)
 Gober v. Birmingham,  (per curiam)
 Avent v. North Carolina,  (per curiam)
 Ship-By-Truck Co. v. United States,  (per curiam)
 Richards v. Pennsylvania,  (per curiam)
 Atwood's Transport Lines, Inc. v. United States,  (per curiam)
 Drexel v. Ohio Pardon and Parole Comm'n,  (per curiam)
 Illinois v. United States,  (per curiam)
 Sperry v. Florida ex rel. Florida Bar, 
 United States v. Braverman, 
 Reed v. The Yaka, 
 Norvell v. Illinois, 
 Lopez v. United States, 
 Boesche v. Udall, 
 Campbell v. United States, 
 Haynes v. Washington, 
 Watson v. Memphis, 
 Hathaway v. Texas,  (per curiam)
 Yale Transport Corp. v. United States,  (per curiam)
 Food Fair Stores, Inc. v. Zoning Bd. of Appeals of Pompano Beach,  (per curiam)
 Mile Road Corp. v. Boston,  (per curiam)
 Gonzalez v. Chicago,  (per curiam)
 Milne v. Rhode Island,  (per curiam)
 Buffington v. Wainwright,  (per curiam)
 Counts v. Counts,  (per curiam)
 Smith v. Kansas,  (per curiam)
 Cepero v. United States,  (per curiam)
 Alabama v. United States,  (per curiam)
 Cepero v. United States Congress,  (per curiam)
 Arizona v. California, 
 Wheeldin v. Wheeler, 
 McNeese v. Board of Ed. for Community Unit School Dist. 187, 
 Goss v. Board of Ed. of Knoxville, 
 Plumbers v. Borden, 
 Iron Workers v. Perko, 
 United States v. Carlo Bianchi & Co., 
 Rideau v. Louisiana, 
 NLRB v. General Motors Corp., 
 Retail Clerks v. Schermerhorn (Schermerhorn I), 
 Jones v. Healing,  (per curiam)

External links

References

1963 in United States case law